Dysschema schadei is a moth of the family Erebidae. It was described by Schaus in 1927. It is found in Paraguay.

References

Dysschema
Moths described in 1927